Robert Joseph Modrzejewski (born July 3, 1934) is a retired United States Marine Corps officer who is a recipient of the United States' highest military decoration, the Medal of Honor, for conspicuous gallantry in the Vietnam War.

Early life
Robert Modrzejewski was born on July 3, 1934 in Milwaukee, Wisconsin. He graduated from Milwaukee's Casimir Pulaski High School in 1953. He attended Wisconsin State Teachers College prior to entering the University of Wisconsin–Milwaukee, where he earned a Bachelor of Science degree in Education in 1957.

Military career
Modrzejewski joined the Marine Corps Reserve in 1955 while at the University of Wisconsin-Milwaukee, and was a member of the Platoon Leaders Class; upon graduation in June 1957, he was commissioned a second lieutenant.

Modrzejewski completed the 4-57 Basic Course, The Basic School, Marine Corps Schools, Quantico, Virginia, in March 1958, then served as an instructor at The Basic School until the following May.

From June 1958 until September 1959, Modrzejewski was attached to the 3rd Battalion, 3rd Marines, 3rd Marine Division, and served as a platoon leader of H&S Company, as well as platoon leader and S-2 Officer of Company I and Company M, respectively. He was promoted to first lieutenant in December 1958.

Transferred to Camp Lejeune, North Carolina, Modrzejewski served, successively, as Equipment Officer with the Landing Support Company, 2nd Service Battalion, 2nd Marine Division until May 1960; Pathfinder Team Leader of the 2nd Force Reconnaissance Company, until December 1960; Pathfinder Team Leader with Sub Unit One, HMR(L)-262, MAG-26 at Marine Corps Air Facility, New River, North Carolina, until May 1961, and again as Pathfinder Team Leader and Parachute Pathfinder Team Leader with the 2d Force Reconnaissance Company, until May 1962. He was promoted to captain in May 1962.

Modrzejewski saw a three-year tour of duty as Assistant Officer in Charge, Marine Corps Recruiting Station, Cincinnati, Ohio. In May 1965, he returned to the Marine Corps Schools in Quantico, Virginia, and served as executive officer, Company E, Officers Candidates Schools, until August 1965, then attended the Amphibious Warfare School, completing the course in February 1966.

Ordered to the West Coast, then to the Republic of Vietnam, Modrzejewski assumed duty as commanding officer of Company K, 3rd Battalion, 4th Marines, 3rd Marine Division. It was during this period, during Operation Hastings, that he distinguished himself above and beyond the call of duty — for which he was awarded the Medal of Honor.

In a White House ceremony on March 12, 1968, President Lyndon B. Johnson presented the Medal of Honor to two Marines for their actions in Vietnam — Major Modrzejeski and Second Lieutenant John J. McGinty, III.

Modrzejewski later served as Battalion S-3 and Company Commander until December 1966, then became Command Operations Center Watch Officer with Headquarters Company, 3rd Marine Division, Fleet Marine Force, until May 1967. He was promoted to major in January 1967.

Upon his return to the United States in June 1967, Modrzejewski was assigned to the United States Naval Academy in Annapolis, Maryland, as Commanding Officer of the Marine Barracks. In January 1970, he entered the Armed Forces Staff College, Norfolk, Virginia, and completed the course the following June. He then reported to Marine Corps Air Station, Kaneohe, Hawaii, for duty with Headquarters and Service Company, First Marine Brigade.

In 1976, Modrzejewki earned his Master's degree in Education from Pepperdine University in  Los Angeles, California.

Colonel Modrzejewski retired from the Marine Corps in August 1986.

Decorations
A complete list of his medals and decorations includes:

Medal of Honor citation
The President of the United States in the name of The Congress takes pleasure in presenting the MEDAL OF HONOR to

for service as set forth in the following CITATION:

/S/ LYNDON B. JOHNSON

Honors
In 2004, the UWM Alumni Association honored Modrzejewski with a Distinguished Alumnus Award.

In 2005, the State of Oklahoma designated March 26, 2005 as "Colonel Robert J. Modrzejewski Day" and issued a resolution praising the courage of the Medal of Honor recipient.

See also

List of Medal of Honor recipients for the Vietnam War

References
Inline

General

1934 births
Living people
United States Marine Corps Medal of Honor recipients
Recipients of the Gallantry Cross (Vietnam)
United States Marine Corps colonels
United States Marine Corps personnel of the Vietnam War
University of Wisconsin–Milwaukee alumni
Military personnel from Milwaukee
Vietnam War recipients of the Medal of Honor
American people of Polish descent